The cholecystokinin B receptor also known as CCKBR or CCK2 is a protein that in humans is encoded by the CCKBR gene.

This gene encodes a G protein-coupled receptor for gastrin and cholecystokinin (CCK), regulatory peptides of the brain and gastrointestinal tract. This protein is a type B gastrin receptor, which has a high affinity for both sulfated and nonsulfated CCK analogs and is found principally in the central nervous system and the gastrointestinal tract. A misspliced transcript variant including an intron has been observed in cells from colorectal and pancreatic tumors.

CNS effects 
CCK receptors significantly influence neurotransmission in the brain, regulating anxiety, feeding, and locomotion. CCK-B expression may correlate parallel to anxiety and depression phenotypes in humans. CCK-B receptors possess a complex regulation of dopamine activity in the brain. CCK-B activation appears to possess a general inhibitory action on dopamine activity in the brain, opposing the dopamine-enhancing effects of CCK-A. However, the effects of CCK-B on dopamine activity vary depending on location. CCK-B antagonism enhances dopamine release in rat striatum. Activation enhances GABA release in rat anterior nucleus accumbens. CCK-B receptors modulate dopamine release, and influence the development of tolerance to opioids. CCK-B activation decreases amphetamine-induced DA release, and contributes to individual variability in response to amphetamine.

In rats, CCK-B antagonism prevents the stress-induced reactivation of cocaine-induced conditioned place preference, and prevents the long-term maintenance and reinstatement of morphine-induced CPP. Blockade of CCK-B potentiates cocaine-induced dopamine overflow in rat striatum.  CCK-B may pose a modulatory role in parkinson's disease. Blockade of CCK-B in dopamine-depleted squirrel monkeys induces significant enhancement of locomotor response to L-DOPA. One study shows that visual hallucinations in Parkinson's disease are associated with cholecystokinin −45C>T polymorphism, and this association is still observed in the presence of the cholecystokinin-A receptor TC/CC genotype, indicating a possible interaction of these two genes in the visual hallucinogenesis in Parkinson's disease.

Gastrointestinal Tract 
The cholecystokinin B receptor is stimulated by CCK and gastrin in the stomach during digestion.

Selective Ligands 
The cholecystokinin B receptor responds to a number of ligands.

Agonists 
 Cholecystokinin
 CCK-4
 Gastrin
 BBL-454

Antagonists
 Proglumide
 CI-988
 CI-1015
 L-365,260 
 L-369,293 
 YF476
 YM-022
 RP-69758
 LY-225,910
 LY-288,513
 PD-135,158
 PD-145,942

Inverse agonists
 L-740,093

See also 
 Cholecystokinin receptor
 Cholecystokinin antagonist

References

Further reading

External links 
 

G protein-coupled receptors
Cholecystokinin receptors